"Avant-Garde and Kitsch" is the title of a 1939 essay by Clement Greenberg, first published in the Partisan Review, in which he claimed that avant-garde and modernist art was a means to resist the "dumbing down" of culture caused by consumerism. 

The term "kitsch" came into use in the 1860s or 1870s in Germany's street markets, and referred to pictures that were cheap, popular, and marketable. Greenberg considers kitsch to be "ersatz culture," a simulacrum of high culture that adopts many of its exterior trappings but none of its subtleties.

Key ideas 
Greenberg believed that the avant-garde arose in order to defend aesthetic standards from the decline of taste perpetuated by the mass-production of consumer society, and saw kitsch and art as opposites. 

One of his more controversial claims was that kitsch was equivalent to Academic art: "All kitsch is academic, and conversely, all that is academic is kitsch." He argued this based on the fact that Academic art, such as that in the 19th century, was heavily centered in rules and formulations that were taught and tried to make art into something learnable and easily expressible. He later came to withdraw from his position of equating the two, as it became heavily criticized.

Sources
 Greenberg, Clement. Art and Culture. Beacon Press, 1961
 Greenberg, Clement. Homemade Esthetics: Observations on Art and Taste. Oxford University Press, 1999.
 Rubenfeld, Florence. Clement Greenberg: A Life. Scribner, 1997.

References

External links
 "Avant-Garde and Kitsch"

Aesthetics literature
1939 essays
Works originally published in Partisan Review
Works about avant-garde and experimental art